Charles Ezra Daniel (November 11, 1895September 13, 1964) was a United States senator from South Carolina and founder of Daniel International Corporation.

Born in Elberton, Georgia, he moved with his family to Anderson, South Carolina in 1898. He attended the public schools, was a cadet at The Citadel (Charleston) from 1916 to 1918 and during the First World War served as a lieutenant in the infantry from 1917 to 1919. He was a businessman with interests in construction, banking, building supplies, telecommunications, insurance, and airlines, and was a life trustee of Clemson College and a member of the board of South Carolina Foundation of Independent Colleges.

He and R. Hugh Daniel co-founded Daniel International Construction Corporation, which, at one time, was the largest construction company in the world. The corporation was based in Greenville, South Carolina. In 1963 he was given the "Industrialist of the Year" award by President Kennedy.

Daniel was appointed, on September 6, 1954, as a Democrat to the U.S. Senate to fill the vacancy caused by the death of Burnet R. Maybank, and served from September 6, 1954, until his resignation December 23, 1954; he was not a candidate for election to fill the vacancy. He resumed management of his business interests and helped persuade Kohler to build a factory in Spartanburg on a 260-acre lot in 1955. He died in Greenville in 1964 and was interred in Springwood Cemetery.

References

 Retrieved on 2008-03-18

1895 births
1964 deaths
Politicians from Greenville, South Carolina
United States Army officers
The Citadel, The Military College of South Carolina alumni
People from Elberton, Georgia
Democratic Party United States senators from South Carolina
South Carolina Democrats
Clemson University trustees
People from Anderson, South Carolina
20th-century American politicians
20th-century American academics